Christian Rubio Sivodedov (born 7 November 1997) is a Swedish footballer who plays for Norrby as a midfielder.

Career

Djurgårdens IF
Rubio Sivodedov started playing football in Djurgårdens IF at the age of six. During his youth years in Djurgården Rubio went on trials at both Manchester City and Newcastle United. He made his Allsvenskan debut for Djugårdens IF in the 2014 season.

Schalke 04
On the 29 January 2015, he joined German side Schalke 04.

Strømsgodset
Sivodedov joined Norwegian club Strømsgodset in 2017. In March 2018, he was loaned out to GIF Sundsvall for the summer. After coming back from loan, the player's agent said that he had no future at Strømsgodset.  His contract with Strømsgodset expired on 31 July 2018. Strømsgodset announced that he had joined GIF Sundsvall on a permanent transfer.

Norrby
On 20 January 2022, Rubio Sivodedov signed a two-year contract with Norrby.

Personal life
The last name "Rubio" comes from his Cuban-born father while the last name "Sivodedov" comes from his Russian-born mother.

References

External links

1997 births
Living people
Swedish people of Cuban descent
Swedish people of Russian descent
Swedish footballers
Sweden youth international footballers
Association football midfielders
Djurgårdens IF Fotboll players
FC Schalke 04 II players
Strømsgodset Toppfotball players
GIF Sundsvall players
Akropolis IF players
Norrby IF players
Allsvenskan players
Regionalliga players
Eliteserien players
Ettan Fotboll players
Superettan players
Swedish expatriate footballers
Expatriate footballers in Germany
Swedish expatriate sportspeople in Germany
Expatriate footballers in Norway
Swedish expatriate sportspeople in Norway
People from Sundsvall
Sportspeople from Västernorrland County